Tim Maeyens (born in Bruges, 23 August 1981) is a Belgian rower who competes primarily in the single scull. He competed at three Olympic Games.

He started rowing at the age of nine and rows for the Royal Rowing Association of Bruges.

In 1999, Maeyens won the bronze medal in the single scull at the Junior World Rowing Championships.

In 2002, he teamed up with Christophe Raes to finish sixth place in the double scull at the World Rowing Under 23 Championships.

In 2004, he made the finals on the Olympic Games in Athens and earned sixth place.
Maeyens again made the final in the 2008 Olympics, this time finishing fourth, 1.8 seconds out of a medal.

Tim Maeyens graduated as bio-engineering to University of Ghent.

References

External links 
 Tim Maeyens' Website
 Profile at World Rowing
 profile on the website Beijing 2008
 Profile roeieninbelgie.be website
 Website Flemish Rowing League

1981 births
Living people
Belgian male rowers
Rowers at the 2004 Summer Olympics
Rowers at the 2008 Summer Olympics
Rowers at the 2012 Summer Olympics
Olympic rowers of Belgium
Sportspeople from Bruges